Parliamentary elections were held in Djibouti on 19 December 1997. The Front for the Restoration of Unity and Democracy, which had boycotted the last election, ran joint candidates with the ruling People's Rally for Progress. Together, they won all 65 seats in the National Assembly, with the PRP taking 54 and the FRUD 11. Voter turnout was 56.7%.

Results

References

Djibouti
Parliamentary
Elections in Djibouti
Djibouti